James Bouvias Pruitt is a former professional American football player who played wide receiver for six seasons in the NFL for the Miami Dolphins (1986–1988, 1990–1991) and Indianapolis Colts (1988–1989); He finished his career in the CFL playing for Ottawa and Sacramento.

References

1964 births
Living people
Players of American football from Los Angeles
American football wide receivers
Cal State Fullerton Titans football players
Miami Dolphins players
Indianapolis Colts players